This list of Ramsar sites in British Overseas Territories includes wetlands that are considered to be of international importance under the Ramsar Convention. The British Overseas Territories currently have 16 sites designated as "Wetlands of International Importance". For a full list of all Ramsar sites worldwide, see List of Ramsar wetlands of international importance.

Bermuda

British Indian Ocean Territory

British Virgin Islands

Turks and Caicos Islands

Cayman Islands

Cyprus

Falkland Islands

Saint Helena, Ascension and Tristan da Cunha

See also
 Ramsar Convention
 List of Ramsar sites worldwide

References

 
Overseas Territories
Ramsar sites